Nicolas Grandjean (born February 14, 1967) is a French professor of physics. His achievements include over 600 books and articles, giving him an h-index of 62.

Biography
Grandjean was born in Dijon, France, and is a citizen of that country. He studied at the University of Clermont-Ferrand and Nice-Sophia Antipolis. In 1991, he joined the Solid-State Physics and Solar Energy Laboratory, a division of the French National Center for Scientific Research where he studied physical properties of nanostructures. By 1994 he obtained his Ph.D. and became a CNRS winner. Later on, as a senior research fellow, he worked at the Research Center for Heteroepitaxy and its Applications, a division of Sophia Antipolis. In 2004 he became a tenure professor at the École Polytechnique Fédérale de Lausanne and in June 2009 assisted in the creation of the Novagan startup, following by becoming a director of the Laboratory of Advanced Semiconductors for Photonics and Electronics where he still serves.

Research
In August 1999 he along with his colleagues have discovered that gallium nitride (GaN) and quantum dots (QDs) can grow due to the  temperature once injected into aluminium nitride (AlN) matrix. By combining those and both  molecular beam epitaxy and three molecular monolayers it produces a glowing white light. In September 1996 he and his group have successfully nitrated a sapphire. In December 1999 he used Stranski–Krastanov growth mode for room temperature photoluminescence by combining it with molecular beam epitaxy and gallium/aluminium nitride quantum dots.

References

1967 births
Living people
French physicists
Scientists from Dijon
Academic staff of the École Polytechnique Fédérale de Lausanne